Exaeretia mesosceptra is a moth in the family Depressariidae. It was described by Edward Meyrick in 1915. It is found in Peru.

The wingspan is about 21 mm. The forewings are whitish ochreous, with a few scattered blackish specks and a narrow somewhat irregular-edged median fuscous streak irrorated with blackish almost from the base to the apex but not quite reaching either. The hindwings are whitish grey.

References

Moths described in 1915
Exaeretia
Moths of South America